Mix & Genest was founded on 1 October 1879 by the businessman Wilhelm Mix and the engineer Werner Genest in Berlin-Schöneberg. The company was initially an 1879 branch of the ITT Corporation. It was very successful and became one of the pioneers in low voltage devices. Among the products were devices for telephony and telegraphy. By 1904 the company had already 2300 employees and subsidiaries in London and Amsterdam.
In 1920 AEG bought the majority of the stock shares.

Mix & Genest was acquired by the ITT Corporation in 1930. The name Mix & Genest was dropped in 1958.

References

Bibliography 
 —Festschrift 75 Jahre Mix & Genest 1879–1954. Mix-und-Genest-Aktiengesellschaft Stuttgart, Stuttgart-Zuffenhausen 1954.

External links
 

Bell System
ITT Inc.
Defunct manufacturing companies of Germany
Defunct telecommunications companies
Defunct technology companies of Germany
Electronics companies of Germany
Engineering companies of Germany
Telecommunications companies of Germany
Manufacturing companies established in 1879
Manufacturing companies disestablished in 1958
1958 disestablishments in Germany
Electronics companies established in 1879
Telecommunications companies established in 1879
German companies established in 1879
Telecommunications companies disestablished in 1958